David Michineau (born June 6, 1994) is a French basketball player for Napoli Basket of the Lega Basket Serie A. He was drafted by the New Orleans Pelicans in the 2016 NBA draft, with his rights being traded to the Los Angeles Clippers not too long afterwards.

Professional career
Born in the French overseas department of Guadeloupe, Michineau made his professional debut for French LNB Pro A outfit ES Chalon-Sur-Saône during the 2013-14 season. In the 2015-16 season, Michineau helped Chalon advance to the final of the Leaders Cup and to the Final Four of the FIBA Europe Cup. He also saw the court in 34 Pro A contests that season with per-game averages of 5.6 points, one rebound and 1.5 assists.

On July 22, 2016, Michineau returned to France, signing with Hyères-Toulon.

Michineau re-signed with Levallois Metropolitans on May 4, 2020.

In the off-season 2022, he left for Italy, agreeing terms with Napoli Basket of the Lega Basket Serie A.

NBA draft rights
On June 23, 2016, Michineau was selected by the New Orleans Pelicans in the 2016 NBA draft and was then traded to the Los Angeles Clippers on draft night. He joined the Clippers for the 2016 NBA Summer League. 

On February 10, 2022, Michineau's draft rights were traded to the Sacramento Kings as part of a four-team trade. On February 8, 2023, the Kings traded the draft rights to Michineau to the Brooklyn Nets in exchange for Kessler Edwards and cash considerations.

National team career
In 2012, Michineau played the Albert-Schweitzer-Tournament in Germany with the French under 18 national team.

References

1994 births
Living people
Champagne Châlons-Reims Basket players
Cholet Basket players
Élan Chalon players
French men's basketball players
Guadeloupean men's basketball players
HTV Basket players
New Orleans Pelicans draft picks
Metropolitans 92 players
People from Les Abymes
Point guards
Napoli Basket players